Mame Fatma Diagne (born 20 March 1989) is a Senegalese footballer who plays as a defender for Tigresses de Thiès and the Senegal women's national team.

International career
Diagne capped for Senegal at senior level during the 2012 African Women's Championship.

References

1989 births
Living people
Women's association football defenders
Senegalese women's footballers
Senegal women's international footballers